DENIS-P J020529.0−115925 is a brown dwarf system in the constellation of Cetus. It is located 64 light-years (19.8 parsecs) away, based on the system's parallax. It was first found in the Deep Near Infrared Survey of the Southern Sky.

This is a triple brown dwarf system: objects that do not have enough mass to fuse hydrogen like stars. The two brightest components, designated A and B respectively, are both L-type objects. As of 2003, the two were separated 0.287° along a position angle of 246°.

Component B was observed as elongated, suggesting a third component. This third component, named C, is a T-type object.

See also
 DENIS-P J1058.7−1548
 DENIS-P J1228.2−1547
 DENIS-P J082303.1−491201 b
 DENIS-P J101807.5−285931

References

Triple star systems
Brown dwarfs
L-type stars
T-type stars
Cetus (constellation)
DENIS objects
Astronomical objects discovered in 1997